Welcome Home, Johnny Bristol is a 1972 television film directed by George McCowan and starring Martin Landau and Jane Alexander. The screenplay concerns a soldier returning from Vietnam, where he was a POW, who finds his home town missing. It is one of the earliest films to depict post traumatic stress disorder.

Plot
Johnny Bristol, is a Vietnam veteran who, as a prisoner, kept his sanity by remembering his home town of Charles, Vermont. He recalls a happy town with picnics and band concerts in a small town atmosphere. All the while suffering in a cage from abuse, poor food and neglect.
After he is rescued, he is sent to a VA hospital to recuperate. During therapy he and his nurse, Anne Palmer become engaged.
The couple want to go to his home town, but when he tries to go there, he is told there is no such place as Charles, Vermont. When he insists there is such a place, he is treated as a crazy vet. Anne tries to help him find an explanation.
Bristol becomes convinced that somehow the government is responsible for his home town's disappearance.  At the end of the movie, we learn that he grew up in an orphanage located at the corner of Charles and Vermont streets.

Legacy
From the outset Bristol is depicted as unwell, and his suspicions of a government conspiracy are considered preposterous and later proven untrue. Later films, especially in the 1980s (such as the similarly-named Welcome Home), presented stories in which the characters who make such claims are credible and proven true.

External links

References

American television films
1972 in American television
1972 television films
1972 films
Vietnam War films
Films directed by George McCowan
1970s English-language films